Kabaddi at the 2014 Asian Games was held in Songdo Global University Gymnasium, Incheon, South Korea from 28 September to 3 October 2014. Both of India's men's and women's teams faced and defeated Iran's respective teams in the finals, earning India's teams the Gold while Iran's teams won the Silver. Meanwhile the men's team for both South Korea and Pakistan won the Bronze, as well as the women's teams of Bangladesh and Thailand, after their respective defeats in semifinals.

Schedule

Medalists

Medal table

Draw
A draw ceremony was held on 21 August 2014 to determine the groups for the men's and women's competitions. The teams were seeded based on their final ranking at the 2010 Asian Games.

Men

Group A
 (1)
 (3)

Group B
 (2)
 (3)

Women

Group A
 (1)
 (3)

Group B
 (2)
 (3)

Final standing

Men

Women

References

External links
Official website

 
2014 Asian Games events
2014
Asian Games
2014 Asian Games